Daryino is a rural locality (a selo) and the administrative centre of Partizansky Selsoviet, Meleuzovsky District, Bashkortostan, Russia. The population was 801 as of 2010. There are 6 streets.

Geography 
Daryino is located 16 km north of Meleuz (the district's administrative centre) by road. Samarovka is the nearest rural locality.

References 

Rural localities in Meleuzovsky District